Gonatotrichus minutus is a species of millipede in the family Siphonophoridae, described in 1922 by the Swiss zoologist Johann Carl. The species is endemic to Malaysia. The color is brownish-yellow, with lighter-colored legs. It differs from other Malaysian siphonophorids by its small size, the aspect ratio of its beak and antennae and the shape of the front gonopods.

References

Animals described in 1922
Siphonophorida
Millipedes of Asia
Invertebrates of Malaysia